Philip Henty (4 February 1883 – 21 October 1949) was an Australian cricketer. He played seven first-class matches for Tasmania between 1922 and 1929.

See also
 List of Tasmanian representative cricketers

References

External links
 

1883 births
1949 deaths
Australian cricketers
Tasmania cricketers
Cricketers from Melbourne
People from Berwick, Victoria